The Guitolão is a chordophone exclusively designed by one of the masters of Portuguese guitars making, the luthier Gilberto Grácio. He started to develop the prototype instrument, originally built for Carlos Paredes in 2001, and only 3 types were made. The term Guitolão, is a match from the lexical between Portuguese Guitar and Violão (Guit + olão). 
Although, there are some connoisseurs who have tried to undo this neologism, but the use of the term makes sense because the initial idea was to create an instrument similar to a Portuguese guitar, but without the need of an accompaniment instrument (typical from the famous Portuguese musical genre, Fado). So while this is not the most correct terminology, however, is the one that makes more sense.

After a long process of calibration and calculation of the length of the vibrating strings to have the correct measurement, allowing a perfect pitch, this instrument becomes a balanced soloist guitar type, with huge richness in harmonics, largely due to the increased length of the string (from the bridge to the nut are 24,4 inch). Another important aspect is the dynamic response from the 12th fret of this instrument, that the normal Portuguese guitar does not retain.

Tuning 

The Guitolão is a twelve-stringed musical instrument (six orders of double strings), and is usually tuned a fifth below the typical Lisbon Guitar tune (three tones and a half), although there are other tunes that can be used and exploited too.
Its tuning is (from High to Low)

E4 / E4 ; D4 / D4, A3 / A3 ; E3 / E3 ; D4 / D3 ; G3/G2

Morphology and Organology 

It can be said that has some similarities compared to the current Portuguese guitar, although it has the following differences:

 A larger resonance box
 The body format is similar to some old English Guitars built in the eighteenth century
 Increase the width of the box (about 0.78 inch larger than the Portuguese Lisbon Guitar)
 Increase in scale over 6 inches (15.24 cm)
 The chromatic scale is divide in 23 metal frets (13 to the junction of the body and 10 on the soundboard)
 Longer neck 
 Higher caliber and thickness of the strings 
 The bridge is not fixed on a saddle (single piece constructed of bone and wood)
 Placement rosette in the mouth of the instrument
 The box has a cut-out in form of a pear
 Traditional woods were chosen: Spruce (top soundboard); Rosewood (body sides and back soundboard); Ebony (fretboard ) and Mahogany(neck)

References 
 Castela, Luís Pedro, https://www.academia.edu/1811030/A_guitarra_portuguesa_e_a_cancao_de_Coimbra_subsidios_para_o_seu_estudo_e_contextualizacao
 Almeida, José Lúcio, http://jose-lucio.com/Pagina2/Guitolao.htm

See also
Portuguese Guitar
Bandolim
Viola braguesa
Rabeca
Gaita transmontana
Cavaquinho

Mandolin family instruments